Jerome Barkum (born July 18, 1950) is an American former professional football player who was a wide receiver and tight end for 12 years with the New York Jets of the National Football League (NFL). He was drafted by the Jets out of Jackson State University with the 9th overall pick in the first round of the 1972 NFL Draft. In 1973, he was selected to the Pro Bowl as a WR. His biggest catch in the NFL was made in Shea Stadium in a 1981 clash against the Miami Dolphins in the last seconds of the game to lift the Jets to victory 16-15. The Jets made the playoffs that year for the first time since their loss to the Kansas City Chiefs in 1969. Barkum was also a part of the Jets team in the 1982 season that made it to that year's AFC Championship.

In 2013 Jerome Barkum started Smooth Jazz Jams Radio TV, as it is the most popular viewing and listening on TV. With over 95 world artists' endorsements, featuring smooth jazz, chill lounge, reggae, and more. Their award-winning jingle was produced by Konstantin Klashtorni and is the absolute best.

References

External links 

1950 births
Living people
Sportspeople from Gulfport, Mississippi
Players of American football from Mississippi
American football tight ends
American football wide receivers
Jackson State Tigers football players
New York Jets players
American Conference Pro Bowl players